NGC 7741 is a barred spiral galaxy located in the constellation Pegasus. It is located at a distance of circa 40 million light years from Earth, which, given its apparent dimensions, means that NGC 7741 is about 50,000 light years across. It was discovered by William Herschel on September 10, 1784.

NGC 7741 has a strong bar and two spiral arms. The spiral arms are patchy and diffuse and their inner part forms a pseudoring. There are numerous HII regions along the bar and the spiral arms, and a total number of 10 HII region complexes have been observed, with radius 6 arcseconds. They have ages between 5 and 9 million years. The total stellar mass of NGC 7741 is estimated to be .

NGC 7741 belongs to a small galaxy group known as the NGC 7741 group. Other members of the group are the galaxies UGC 12732, and UGC 12791.

Gallery

References

External links 

NGC 7741 on SIMBAD

Barred spiral galaxies
Pegasus (constellation)
7741
12754
72237
Astronomical objects discovered in 1784
Discoveries by William Herschel